San Antone Ambush is a 1949 American Western film directed by Philip Ford and written by Norman S. Hall. The film stars Monte Hale, Bette Daniels, Paul Hurst, Roy Barcroft, James Cardwell, and Trevor Bardette. The film was released on October 7, 1949, by Republic Pictures.

Plot

Cast     
Monte Hale as Lieutenant Ross Kincaid
Bette Daniels as Sally Wheeler
Paul Hurst as Happy Daniels
Roy Barcroft as Henchman Roberts
James Cardwell as Clint Wheeler
Trevor Bardette as Wade Shattuck
Lane Bradford as Al Thomas
Francis Ford as Major Farnsworth
Tommy Coats as Wheeler cohort
Tom London as Bartender Tim
Edmund Cobb as Marshal Kennedy

References

External links 
 

1949 films
American Western (genre) films
1949 Western (genre) films
Republic Pictures films
Films directed by Philip Ford
American black-and-white films
1940s English-language films
1940s American films